Pegatron Corporation is a Taiwanese electronics manufacturing company that mainly develops computing, communications and consumer electronics for branded vendors. It also develops, designs and manufactures computer peripherals and components. Pegatron's primary products include notebooks, netbook computers, desktop computers, game consoles, handheld devices, motherboards, video cards and LCD TVs, as well as broadband communication products such as smartphones, set-top boxes and cable modems.

History 
In January 2008, ASUSTeK Computer began a major restructuring of its operations, splitting into three independent companies: Asus (focused on applied first-party branded computers and electronics); Pegatron (focused on OEM manufacturing of motherboards and components); and Unihan Corporation (focused on non-PC manufacturing such as cases and moulding). In the process of the restructuring, a highly criticised pension plan restructuring effectively zeroed out the existing pension balances. The company paid out all contributions previously made by employees. On 1 June 2010, Asus spun off Pegatron Corp.

Pegatron has in recent years become a significant components supplier for Tesla Inc. During the second wave of the COVID-19 pandemic in India, Pegatron had to halt their production when some employees tested positive for the virus. Pegatron's India plant took over some production of Apple iPhones due to the pandemic affecting its Shenzhen operations.

Corporate profile

Operations
Pegatron's principal executive offices and many assets are located in Taiwan. As of March 2010, Pegatron had approximately 5,646 employees stationed in Taiwan, 89,521 in China, 2,400 in the Czech Republic and 200 in the United States, Mexico, and Japan. Pegatron has manufacturing plants in Taiwan, the Czech Republic, Mexico, Indonesia, and China, and customer service centers in the United States and Japan.

Subsidiaries

Unihan Corporation
As part of the corporate restructuring of ASUSTeK Computer in 2007, Pegatron acquired Unihan Corporation from ASUSTeK in January 2008. Since 2008, the Unihan Corporation has been a subsidiary of Pegatron Corporation that designs and manufactures computers, computer peripherals and audio-video products.

Corporate social responsibility
In June 2008, with its PUreCSR corporate responsibility system, Pegatron became a member of the EICC (Electronic Industry Citizenship Coalition), a group of companies in the electronics industry that supports the implementation of the Code of Conduct throughout the electronics and information and communications technology supply chain, ensuring safe working conditions, respect and dignity to employees, and environmentally responsible manufacturing processes. Pegatron's corporate responsibility system, PUreCSR (which stands for Pegatron & Unihan reduce, reuse, recycle, recovery, replace & repair Corporate Social Responsibility), meets the international standards: the ISO 14001 Environmental Management System, the OHSAS 18001 Occupational Health & Safety Management System, and the QC 080000 Hazardous Substance Process Management System. On 18 May 2010, the board of directors at Pegatron unanimously approved to appropriate a sum within 0.5% of net income every year to charity.

PEGA Design and Engineering (PEGA D&E)
PEGA Design and Engineering is Pegatron's design team that was originally branched off from the ASUSTeK design team. The PEGA D&E helps Pegatron's clients with product development, including market research, conceptualization, product design, materials study, and production.In addition to 3C (computer, communication, consumer) electronic products, Pegatron designs home appliances and home decor products such as LCD TVs, LED lighting, phones and more.

PEGA CASA (Pegatron MID - ID design team) 
Led by Alain Lee, the PEGA CASA design team (originally branched off from the Asus design team) is dedicated to the design and development of non-IT products in addition to the existing IT product design, including notebooks, smartphones, e-books, network communication equipment, displays, projectors, cleaning robots and more. These non-IT products include home appliances (PEGA CASA), fashion accessories, vehicle accessories (PEGA MOTORS), building interior design and building materials, multimedia ads and marketing, and cultural businesses.

Controversies

Working conditions
In December 2014, a BBC investigation exposed poor working conditions and employee mistreatment at Pegatron factories making Apple products near Shanghai. It found staff being forced to work eighteen days in a row without any days off, workers falling asleep on the production line during shifts lasting between 12 and 16 hours, forced overtime, and a cramped dormitory room which twelve workers were forced to share.

In August 2016, China Labor Watch published a report which stated that working conditions had not improved since 2014. The average worker at Pegatron's Shanghai factory works 80 hours of overtime a month. Over 62% of workers worked more than 100 overtime hours in March 2016. Workers are required to perform up to 1 hour a day of unpaid overwork. 64% of its maintenance department interns are overworked. At the same time, over 96% of Pegatron workers are only making minimum wage, well below Shanghai's average income despite the extra overtime hours they put in.

In November 2020, Apple discovered that Pegatron was using student workers in factories in mainland China. Due to this, Apple suspended their business with Pegatron and stated that they would not grant the company any new business until this practice was ceased.

In December 2020, Pegatron's Shanghai subsidiary Pegaer Technology (Shanghai) Co., Ltd.「昌碩科技」broke out in labor disputes. Thousands of people gathered to ask for salaries. In response, the factory director led the beatings of the people who had gathered, and many police officers came to the scene to suppress it. Some people were beaten to the ground, and many of their fates remain unknown. More than ten people were arrested, triggering a rights defense incident.

See also

 List of companies of Taiwan
 Asus

References

External links
 

Manufacturing companies based in Taipei
Electronics companies established in 2007
Companies listed on the Taiwan Stock Exchange
Electronics companies of Taiwan
Multinational companies headquartered in Taiwan
Taiwanese brands
Taiwanese companies established in 2007